Medlock is a surname. Notable people with the surname include:

 Justin Medlock (born 1983), American football player
 Kevin Medlock (born 1954), Californian award-winning telescope and instrument maker, asteroid 19704 Medlock was named after him
 Mark Medlock (born 1978), German singer
 Owen Medlock (born 1938), English footballer
 Shorty Medlocke (1912-1982), American musician (born Paul Robert Medlock)
 Rickey Medlocke  (born 1950), American musician, grandson of Shorty Medlocke
 Thomas T. Medlock (born 1934), American politician